Edna Freda Indermaur (December 21, 1892 - January 10, 1985) was an American contralto singer.

Biography 
Indermaur was born on December 21, 1892, in Buffalo, New York, United States. She was of Swiss descent and a member of the In der Maur family.

Indermaur made her musical debut at the Aeolian Hall. She performed as a soloist, as a duet performer with Dicie llowvlia, and with the Artone Quartet. Indermaur had a successful career performing in recitals around New York as well as performances at Winthrop University, the Buffalo Festival, and with the Minneapolis Symphony Orchestra.

She married Ernest Eugene Zerkel on May 24, 1926. Indermaur died on January 10, 1985, in Sacramento, California.

References

1892 births
1985 deaths
20th-century American women opera  singers
American operatic contraltos
American people of Swiss descent
Edna
Musicians from Buffalo, New York
Singers from New York (state)